Sannuvanda Kushalappa Uthappa (born 2 December 1993) is an Indian professional field hockey player who plays as an attacking midfielder for the India national team and Kalinga Lancers at the Hockey India League.

S. K. Uthappa made his international debut in 2012 and has since made over 100 appearances for the national team. He was a part of the team that won silver at the 2016 Champions Trophy.

Early life
Uthappa picked up the sport as a profession at the age of eight after watching his brother play hockey for Bangalore University as he grew up. Then a student of Lions School, Gonikoppal in Karnataka's Kodagu district, he was actively involved in sports and won competitions of badminton, football, basketball and hockey. He holds the Karnataka State record for most goals scored (16) in a five-game inter-district tournament, when he played for his district, Kodagu.

Uthappa took to hockey professionally at 14 and joined the Sports Authority of India, Bangalore, in 2004. There he represented his school St. Joseph's Indian High School, and St. Joseph's College of Commerce and Bangalore University, before being chosen to play for the junior team of his State, Karnataka. In 2010, he captained the side to the nationals title in Pune, defeating hockey Punjab in the final. Playing for the senior team in 2011 at the National Championships, he was named the Best Player; his side finished second.

Career

International career

Uthappa made his international debut against South Africa on 16 January 2012 at the first match of a five-match series, in Delhi. He scored a goal in the game, in the 53rd minute. He featured in four of the five games and scored a total of three goals. He was then picked to play at the 2012 Olympics Qualification Tournament and appeared in all of the six games, scoring one goal, against Singapore.

Uthappa captained the side for the first time at the 2016 Asian Champions Trophy in Malaysia, in a league game against Pakistan, in the process of rotation of captaincy the team followed after the 2016 Rio Olympics. His side won the game 3–2.

Club career

Hockey India League
In the inaugural edition of the Hockey India League in 2013, Uthappa was picked up by the Uttar Pradesh Wizards franchise. He played for three editions of the tournament, till 2015. In the 2013 season, the team finished third. For the 2016 season, he was bought by Kalinga Lancers for 54,000. The side finished second. The team won the season in 2017, beating Dabang Mumbai in the final.

Honours

International
Champions Trophy: 2016, second place
Asian Hockey Champions Trophy: 2016

Club
Hockey India League: 2017

Individual
Ekalavya Award, 2014

References

External links

Profile at Hockey India
Profile at International Hockey Federation

Living people
Olympic field hockey players of India
Field hockey players from Karnataka
Field hockey players at the 2012 Summer Olympics
Field hockey players at the 2016 Summer Olympics
People from Kodagu district
1993 births
Kodava people
Indian male field hockey players
Uttar Pradesh Wizards players
Male field hockey midfielders
2014 Men's Hockey World Cup players